Alicia Fulford-Wierzbicki is a New Zealand actress. Her debut performance was in the critically acclaimed film Rain.

The Seattle PI newspaper has described the film as "an exquisitely mixed and applied palette of color and hue to help her story. Rain is gorgeously evocative visually and draws us in as seductively ... a wonderful metaphor for a film that is largely successful".

Agent   Sharon Power

Filmography
Rain (2001)
Fracture (2004)

References

External links

Year of birth missing (living people)
Living people
New Zealand film actresses